Pine Bowl was a 4,000-seat multi-purpose stadium in Loretto, Pennsylvania, United States. It was home to the Saint Francis University Red Flash football team.  The facility opened in 1979.
It was replaced by DeGol Field in 2006.

Defunct college football venues
Saint Francis Red Flash football
Sports venues in Pennsylvania
Multi-purpose stadiums in the United States
Sports venues completed in 1979
1979 establishments in Pennsylvania
Buildings and structures in Cambria County, Pennsylvania